Ballyboden (Baile Buadáin in Irish, meaning "Boden Town") is a locality within the suburb of Rathfarnham in South Dublin, at the foot of the Dublin Mountains between Whitechurch, Ballyroan and Knocklyon.  It is a townland in the civil parish of Rathfarnham in the Barony of Uppercross.

Population
According to the 2006 Census, Ballyboden has a population of about five thousand.

Religion
The Roman Catholic parish of Ballyboden was established in 1973. It is managed by the Order of Saint Augustine.  Within the Archdiocese of Dublin, Rathfarnham parish is the parent of several local parishes.  To accommodate the increasing need for ministry to the residential development of the Rathfarnham area over the last century, Terenure was developed in 1894, Churchtown (1965), Ballyroan (1968), Tallaght (1972), Ballyboden (1973) and Knocklyon (1974).

There had been an Augustinian house of studies in Ballyboden since 1955. It was the home of students of the Order following the two-year course in Philosophy. When the new church in Ballyroan was opened in 1966 the Augustinians took an active part. The Augustinians had acquired Orlagh as a Novitiate in 1872. When University College Dublin moved from Earlsfort Terrace to the new campus at Belfield in south County Dublin in the 1960s and '70s, the order acquired St. Catherines, Ballyboden, previously the residence of Mr. Justice O’Byrne.

The Church of Ireland is located in the pre-Reformation parish church at Whitechurch.

Culture

The Pearse Museum is 700 metres east of Ballyboden centre.

Sport

Ballyboden is home to two Gaelic Athletic Association clubs, Ballyboden Wanderers, who play in Mount Venus Road, and Ballyboden St. Enda's, who have a new playing facility at Sancta Maria College.
Republic of Ireland football player Damien Duff is from the locality as was League of Ireland Premier Division player and Brownlow Medallist Jim Stynes.

Transport

Ballyboden is served by Dublin Bus routes 15b, 61 and 161

See also
 List of towns and villages in Ireland
 Mount Venus

References

External links
 Ballyboden Wanderers
 Ballyboden St. Enda's

Rathfarnham